Margita can refer to:

 Margita, a village near Plandište, Vojvodina, Serbia.
 Margita or Sankt Margarethen im Burgenland, a town near Eisenstadt, Burgenland, Austria.
 Margaret in Balkan languages